The tonalamatl  is a divinatory almanac used in central Mexico in the decades, and perhaps centuries, leading up to the Spanish conquest.  The word itself is Nahuatl in origin, meaning "pages of days".

The tonalamatl was structured around the sacred 260-day year, the tonalpohualli.  This 260-day year consisted of 20 trecena of 13 days each.  Each page of a tonalamatl represented one trecena, and was adorned with a painting of that trecena's reigning deity and decorated with the 13 day-signs and 13 other glyphs.  These day-signs and glyphs were used to cast horoscopes and discern the future.

The best surviving examples of tonalamatl are the Codex Borbonicus and the Codex Borgia.

See also
Aztec calendar

References

Bibliography
 
  
 

Astrological texts
Aztec calendars
Aztec mythology and religion
Almanacs

es:Tonalamatl